Santa Cruz del Norte is a town and municipality in the Mayabeque Province of Cuba. Before 2011 it was part of La Habana Province. It is located on the north shore, between the cities of Havana and Matanzas, at the mouth of the Santa Cruz River.

Overview

The town was founded in 1800, being a fishing community at that time, and achieved municipality status in 1931.

This is the main home of the Havana Club rum distillery; all dark varieties being produced in Santa Cruz del Norte. The distillery can be visited as part of a tour.

Other industries in the municipality include power generation, oil extraction and fishing.

Geography
The municipality is divided into the consejos populares of Santa Cruz del Norte (the town proper) and the villages of Bacunayagua, Boca de Jaruco, Jibacoa, El Fraile, Arcos de Canasí, El Comino, La Sierra, Hershey (or Camilo Cienfuegos), Loma del Tanque, El Rubio and Paula.  A spur of the Hershey Electric Railway connects the town to Matanzas.  This is used mainly by diesel powered freight trains.

Demographics
In 2004, the municipality of Santa Cruz del Norte had a population of 32,576.

Twin towns – sister cities 
Santa Cruz del Norte is twinned with:
 Santa Cruz de Tenerife, Spain

See also
Santa Cruz del Norte Municipal Museum
Municipalities of Cuba
List of cities in Cuba

References

External links

Populated places in Mayabeque Province